Munraj Sahota is a Canadian professional wrestler, better known by the ring name Raj Singh. He is currently signed to Impact Wrestling, where he performs under the ring name Champagne Singh.

Professional wrestling career

Early career (2004–2016) 
Sahota received training from his father Gama Singh and debuted as early as 2003. From 2004 to 2016, as Gama Singh Jr., he wrestled solely in the Canadian promotions including Stampede Wrestling, All-Star Wrestling, Prairie Wrestling Alliance, Great North Wrestling and Power Zone Wrestling. During those years, Singh won Tag Team Championships in All-Star Wrestling and Stampede Wrestling.

Impact Wrestling (2018–present) 
Sahota debuted in Impact Wrestling on the November 1, 2018 episode of Impact!, under the ring name Raj Singh. He debuted with his tag team partner Rohit Raju under the tag team name Desi Hit Squad. They were introduced by their manager and Singh's father Gama Singh. In their debut match, the Desi Hit Squad defeated the team of The Beach Bums (Freddie IV and TJ Crawford). The Desi Hit Squad finished the year with a match during the December 6, episode of Impact!, defeating the team of Damien Hyde and Manny Lemons.

The Desi Hit Squad returned for the January 3, 2019 episode of Impact! in a tag match against the team of Fallah Bahh and KM, a match which was observed by Scarlett Bordeaux, in hopes of winning her favor. The Desi Hit Squad, however, was unsuccessful in winning the match. During the month of January, Singh wrestled his first singles match, losing to Trey Miguel. He later in the month wrestled and lost his second singles match against Fallah Bahh. During the month of February the Desi Hit Squad wrestled against teams including The Rascalz (Dezmond Xavier and Zachary Wentz) and Eddie Edwards and Eli Drake.

Personal life 
Sahota is the son of former professional wrestler Gama Singh. He is also the cousin of wrestler Yuvraj Singh Dhesi, known professionally in the WWE as Jinder Mahal.

Championships and accomplishments 
All-Star Wrestling (Canada)
ASW Tag Team Championship (1 time) – with Tiger Raj Singh
 Border City Wrestling
BCW Can-Am Tag Team Championship (1 time, current) – with Rohit Raju
 Prairie Wrestling Alliance
 PWA Heavyweight Championship (2 times)
PWA Canadian Tag Team Championships (1 time) - with Gama Singh Jr.
 Pro Wrestling Illustrated
 Ranked No. 255 of the top 500 singles wrestlers in the PWI 500 in 2019
 Stampede Wrestling
Stampede British Commonwealth Mid-Heavyweight Championship (1 time)
Stampede Wrestling International Tag Team Championship (2 times) – with Tiger Raj Singh

References

External links
 
 

Living people
Canadian male professional wrestlers
Professional wrestlers from Calgary
21st-century professional wrestlers
Year of birth missing (living people)
Stampede Wrestling British Commonwealth Mid-Heavyweight Champions
Stampede Wrestling International Tag Team Champions